5,10-Methenyltetrahydrofolate (5,10-CH=THF) is a form of tetrahydrofolate that is an intermediate in metabolism.  5,10-CH=THF is a coenzyme that accepts and donates methenyl (CH=) groups. 

It is produced from 5,10-methylenetetrahydrofolate by either a NAD+ dependent methylenetetrahydrofolate dehydrogenase, or a NADP+ dependent dehydrogenase. It can also be produced as an intermediate in histidine catabolism, by formiminotransferase cyclodeaminase, from 5-formiminotetrahydrofolate.

5,10-CH=THF is a substrate for methenyltetrahydrofolate cyclohydrolase, which converts it into 10-formyltetrahydrofolate.

Interactive pathway map

References

Folates
Coenzymes